Eucithara funiculata, common name the corded turrid, is a small sea snail, a marine gastropod mollusk in the family Mangeliidae.

Description
The length of the shell varies between 20 mm and 25 mm.

The shell has a smooth appearance. The outer lip is toothed. The color of the shell is ashy brown, the ribs whitish.

Distribution
This marine species occurs in the Indo-Pacific and off the Philippines and Guam

References

  Reeve, L.A. 1846. Monograph of the genus Mangelia. pls 1-8 in Reeve, L.A. (ed). Conchologia Iconica. London : L. Reeve & Co. Vol. 3.

External links
  Tucker, J.K. 2004 Catalog of recent and fossil turrids (Mollusca: Gastropoda). Zootaxa 682:1-1295.
 
 Smith, Barry D. "Prosobranch gastropods of Guam." Micronesica 35.36 (2003): 244-270. 

funiculata
Gastropods described in 1846